Dmitry Vasilyevich Averkiyev ((October 12, 1836, Yekaterinodar, Russian Empire, — January 20, 1905, Saint Petersburg, Russian Empire) was a Russian playwright, theatre critic, novelist, publicist and translator. He is the author of the Russian libretto to Rogneda by Alexander Serov.

Averkiyev's best known plays were Frol Skorbeyev (Фрол Скорбеев, 1869) and Old Times in Kashira (Каширская старина, 1872); both continued to be produced into the Soviet times. He was also an acclaimed theatre critic who contributed to Epokha, Moskovskiye Vedomosti, Novoye Vremya and Vsemirnaya Illyustratsiya (where he was the head of the literary section, in 1869–1871). Averkiyev's magnum opus On Drama won him the Pushkin Prize in 1893.

References 

Russian dramatists and playwrights
People from Krasnodar
1836 births
1906 deaths
Russian male novelists
Russian librettists
Theatre critics from the Russian Empire
Burials at Nikolskoe Cemetery
19th-century translators from the Russian Empire